Pierre le Pelley I, 13th Seigneur of Sark (1736–1778) was Seigneur of Sark from 1752 to 1778.

References

1736 births
1778 deaths
Seigneurs of Sark
Pierre I